Arizona State Route 202 (SR 202) or Loop 202 is a semi-beltway circling the eastern and southern areas of the Phoenix metropolitan area in central Arizona. It traverses the eastern end and the southern end of the city of Phoenix, in addition to the cities of Tempe, Mesa, Chandler, and Gilbert, and is a vital route in the metropolitan area freeway system. Loop 202 has three officially designated sections along its route; the Red Mountain Freeway, the SanTan Freeway, and the Congressman Ed Pastor Freeway, previously named the South Mountain Freeway (which it is still colloquially known as). The Red Mountain Freeway runs from the Mini Stack Interchange with Interstate 10 (I-10) and State Route 51 (SR 51) in Phoenix to the SuperRedTan Interchange with U.S. Route 60 (US 60) in Mesa. The SanTan Freeway runs from there to an interchange with Interstate 10 (I-10) in Chandler. The Congressman Ed Pastor Freeway runs from there to I-10 in western Phoenix.

Loop 202 was created after different sections of freeway within the Phoenix metro were given the designation, with the first section was designated in 1990. The SanTan Freeway was completed in 2006, while the Red Mountain Freeway section was completed in 2008. The Congressman Ed Pastor Freeway was officially opened on December 21, 2019.

Route description

Loop 202 begins as the Red Mountain Freeway at the Mini Stack, a four-level confluence with I-10 (Inner Loop) and SR 51 (Piestewa Freeway) in Central City, Phoenix. Heading eastward, the route passes through Eastern Phoenix and encounters partial interchanges with SR 143 (Hohokam Expressway) and Sky Harbor Blvd, both which provide motorists direct access to the Sky Harbor Airport. The freeway then skims the northern bank of the Salt River as it passes through Tempe with its downtown skyline visible across the Town Lake. It then crosses the river diagonally on a long bridge before encountering its first major junction with Loop 101 around milepost 9.5. At this point, Loop 202 enters the city of Mesa. It avoids the Salt River Pima–Maricopa Indigenous Community lands and has a junction with SR 87. It also passes the Falcon Field and the adjunct Boeing Mesa Facility. Just shy of the Superstition Mountains, the freeway turns southward and serves the Mesa Community College and the Red Mountain District Park. At milepost 30, it encounters US 60 (Superstition Freeway) on the SuperRedTan Interchange. This segment features HOV lanes from the start of the route to University Drive, with ongoing plans to extend the lanes.

Past the interchange, Loop 202 becomes the SanTan Freeway. Near Eastmark, the route curves west and encounters the western terminus of SR 24 (Gateway Freeway). Simultaneously, Loop 202 provides access to the Phoenix-Mesa Gateway Airport and the ASU Polytechnic campus. The freeway enters Gilbert and serves the Santan Village shopping district and the Mercy Gilbert Hospital. At milepost 50, it has a second interchange with Loop 101, which terminates here, beside the Chandler Fashion Center mall. At milepost 55, Loop 202 has a full-on junction with I-10 by Pecos Park. This section of Loop 202 has HOV lanes through I-10 out to Gilbert Road, also with long-term plans to extend the lanes eastward.

Continuing westward as the Congressman Ed Pastor Freeway (sometimes referred to as the South Mountain Freeway by locals), Loop 202 enters Phoenix as it follows the Pecos Road alignment between the gated communities of the Ahwatukee Foothills Village and the Gila River Indigenous Community. Near Komatke, the freeway curves northward and cuts through the western foothills of the South Mountain Preserve, with a direct interchange to a hotel and casino. The route passes through Laveen and crosses the Salt River again, which is the site of the future SR 30 junction.

History

The final section of the Red Mountain Freeway opened on July 21, 2008, thus marking the completion of the original Regional Freeway System as approved by Maricopa County voters in 1985 by Proposition 300. The portion of the Red Mountain Freeway west of the Pima/Price Freeways was formerly known as the "East Papago Freeway," and it was initially designated SR 217. The remainder of the Red Mountain Freeway was to be SR 216. In 2006, this portion of Loop 202 was used to portray a Saudi Arabian superhighway in the 2007 film, The Kingdom. Filming also took place at Phoenix-Mesa Gateway Airport and the Arizona State University Polytechnic Campus. The city of Mesa received $40,000 for the use of the freeway from NBC Universal.

The SanTan Freeway was completed in 2006. This section of freeway was originally numbered as SR 220. It was given current designation on December 18, 1987, along with the East Papago and Red Mountain Freeway corridors and the portion of the SanTan Freeway east of Price Road.

The third and final leg of Loop 202, the Congressman Ed Pastor Freeway, named in honor of longtime U.S. Representative Ed Pastor (D-AZ), received final approval from the Federal Highway Administration on March 10, 2015, with construction completed at the end of 2019. Initially, the freeway was officially named as the South Mountain Freeway during its conception and construction (and still colloquially known as such), but received its current official name on October 22, 2019. The construction phase divided it into two distinct segments: the "eastern segment" that straddles the Ahwatukee-GRIC border and the "western segment" that parallels 59th Avenue through Laveen. Together, these segments form a  bypass around Downtown Phoenix, linking the metropolitan area's southwestern and southeastern suburbs. The Congressman Ed Pastor Freeway was to be SR 218. By July 19, 1991, it was renumbered as part of Loop 202. The pathway is on the south side of the freeway and is also open to pedestrians and cyclists. The path was added because the former Pecos Road had been a popular cycling route for years.

Controversy
The Congressman Ed Pastor Freeway was the most controversial segment of Loop 202. Construction was delayed due to tension between three groups: regional transportation planners, who insisted that the freeway was necessary to ensure smooth traffic flow in the coming decades; residents of the adjacent Ahwatukee community, who would have lost 120 homes to eminent domain depending on the road's final alignment; and leaders and residents of the adjoining Gila River Indigenous Community (GRIC), who have oscillated between opposing and supporting the freeway in recent years.

The specific alignment of the freeway, initially referred to in 1983 as the "Southwest Loop Highway", was revised several times since 1985, when Maricopa County voters originally approved its construction as part of the regional highway network envisioned under Proposition 300. In 1988, the Maricopa Association of Governments (MAG), the region's transportation planning agency, suggested an alignment of the freeway's western segment along 55th Avenue and an alignment of the eastern segment along Pecos Road. A federal study in 2001 required ADOT to reexamine those suggestions, and the task of recommending the final alignment fell to a Citizen's Advisory Team formed in 2002. In April 2006, that panel released their final recommendations to route the western portion of the freeway four miles further west to connect with Loop 101, and to reject the proposed alignment of the eastern portion along Pecos Road, suggesting that the latter be built on Gila River Indigenous Community land instead. Two months later, ADOT overruled the panel's suggestion for the western segment and opted for the current 59th Avenue alignment instead.

In February 2012, a non-binding referendum was held in the Gila River Indigenous Community on whether the eastern portion of the freeway should be built on community land several miles south of Pecos Road. Options in the referendum were to build on community land, off community land, or not at all. The "no build" option won a plurality of votes, receiving 720 votes out of a total 1,481 cast. MAG sent out a press release soon after making it clear that construction of the freeway would move forward as planned along the Pecos Road alignment. Expecting this outcome, MAG and ADOT had previously (in 2010) shrunk the freeway's footprint from 10 lanes to eight to minimize its impact on Ahwatukee. Fearing the worst possible outcome of the freeway being built without exits onto community land (as would be the case with the Pecos Road alignment), Gila River Indigenous Community residents quickly formulated plans for a new referendum that would exclude the "no build" option, leaving only "yes on Gila River or no on Gila River." The tribal government rejected this proposal in July 2013.

As late as September 2013, the freeway still faced active opposition. A non-profit group called the Gila River Alliance for a Clean Environment filed a civil-rights complaint with ADOT in July, claiming the freeway would disproportionately and adversely affect tribe members. A freeway opposition group called Protecting Arizona's Resources and Children  planned an environmental lawsuit. And the Environmental Protection Agency in August 2013 raised several objections to the state's 12-year, $21 million draft environmental impact statement that had deemed construction of the freeway to be more beneficial to the environment, by improving traffic flow and thus reducing pollution, than building no freeway at all. The EPA claimed that the statement contained overly optimistic traffic projections, did not sufficiently address air quality concerns, and could harm neighboring communities and environmental resources.

By April 2017, ADOT had purchased , or 90% of the land needed for the freeway. While construction was underway in 2017 on both ends of the freeway segment, no work had occurred on a five-mile (8 km) center segment adjacent to South Mountain until a final decision was made by the Ninth Circuit Court of Appeals. A ruling was released in mid-2018 in the action brought by the Gila River Indigenous Community. The Ninth Circuit Court of Appeals rejected Gila River Indigenous Community's claims in December 2017.

Construction
In March 2015, the Federal Highway Administration (FHWA) issued a Record of Decision approving the project and selecting a build alternative. ADOT immediately thereafter commenced right-of-way acquisition and the procurement of final design and construction services in the form of a design-build-maintain contractor or "developer." The developer will have been selected at the end of 2015 (actual date was a couple months after) and freeway construction will have begun in early 2016 (construction started later that same year), with the Chandler Boulevard extension project to facilitate local access beginning in summer 2015. However, new lawsuits in June 2015 from the group Protecting Arizona's Resources and Children, the Sierra Club, and the Gila River Indigenous Community threatened to delay the freeway's construction.

On August 26, 2015, ADOT started demolition of the first houses along the route for the South Mountain Freeway (Congressman Ed Pastor Freeway).

On February 27, 2016, the contract to design, build, and maintain the freeway was awarded to Connect 202 Partners, a joint venture led by Fluor Corporation, with Fluor, Granite Construction, Ames Construction, and Parsons Brinckerhoff being responsible for the final design and construction, and with Fluor and DBi Services, LLC being responsible for maintenance for 30 years.

The first phase of construction of the South Mountain Freeway (Congressman Ed Pastor Freeway) began on September 19, 2016, with improvements to the I-10/Loop 202 (Santan Freeway) interchange.

In early 2017, ADOT announced an updated design for the freeway, including Arizona's first diverging diamond interchanges at Desert Foothills Parkway and 17th Avenue; a reconfiguration near 51st Avenue that moved the freeway interchange to Estrella Drive in order to avoid a GRIC well; and a pedestrian bridge to connect the Del Rio subdivisions bisected by the freeway.

The freeway opened to traffic in late 2019 as originally planned, with construction being finalized in early 2020. The  shared used path between 40th Street and 17th Avenue along the south side of the freeway and the 32nd Street interchange were both opened to the general public on October 31, 2020.

The final part of Loop 202 to open was the diamond interchange with Lindsay Road (exit 43) on the SanTan Freeway section in Gilbert. Initially not a part of the existing freeway, the interchange was planned through a partnership with ADOT and the town government in order to provide direct access to the central business district and other surrounding businesses and neighborhoods. Construction on the interchange began in January 2021 and the interchange opened to traffic on September 15, 2022, following a ribbon-cutting ceremony.

Exit list

Spur route

State Route 202 Spur (Arizona Spur 202) is an unsigned state highway located in Phoenix. It begins at the Red Mountain Freeway (Loop 202) at exit 5. It continues west, intersecting the Hohokam Expressway (SR 143) and ends at Phoenix Sky Harbor International Airport. This is an unsigned route, marked by westbound exit signs from Loop 202 as Sky Harbor Boulevard. The spur route was commissioned in 1993.

Major intersections

See also
 
 
 Roads and freeways in metropolitan Phoenix
 Loop 101
 Loop 303
 Public-private partnerships in the United States

References

External links

Current ADOT information on the Congressman Ed Pastor Freeway
 Archived late 2005 ADOT info on the South Mountain Freeway

202
202
Transportation in Maricopa County, Arizona
Gilbert, Arizona
Transportation in Chandler, Arizona
Transportation in Mesa, Arizona
Transportation in Tempe, Arizona
Public–private partnership projects in the United States